The Islamic Schools of Victoria, or otherwise known as Al-Taqwa College, is a primary and secondary school located on Sayers Road, in Truganina, Victoria, outside Melbourne, Australia. 

The College was built on a 50-acre property on the western side of Melbourne. The College was established by the Islamic Trust fund in 1986. The name was changed to Al-Taqwa College in 2010. Next to the main campus on Sayers Road, a mosque (masjid) was built. Al-Taqwa College is a member of Independent Schools Victoria which is a not-for-profit organisation dedicated to Independent education.

When the school was first established, classes ranged from Prep. to Year 10. As the school grew it expanded and added on VCE (Years 11 and 12). The school has another campus called the Olive Branch, which runs occasional classes in Agriculture and Horticulture.  The school has a branch in Indonesia, named the Al-Taqwa College, International Islamic School of Indonesia.

In 2015, the number of students at Al-Taqwa College - is close to 2,000 with numbers expected to reach 2,500 students in 2018. Subjects taught at the college include English, Maths, Languages other than English (L.O.T.E.), Information Technology, Business, Art and Physical Education.

Controversy
In 2005 there were a number of issues of concern raised involving the school, including a visiting imam's public antisemitic comments.

In 2015, the school principal Omar Hallak was reported to have told students that the terrorist group ISIS was part of a Western plot. The principal's comments were condemned as "reckless and dangerous if true" by James Merlino, Victoria's Education Minister.

COVID-19 cases
During the 2020 COVID-19 pandemic in Australia, Al-Taqwa College was one of the biggest case clusters in Victoria, and the second biggest cluster outside of public housing and aged care, with 210 confirmed cases linked to the college as of mid-August.

Again in 2021, the school was closed after a teacher tested positive for COVID-19. This later lead to statewide lockdowns in Victoria.

See also
Islam in Australia
Islamic organisations in Australia
Islamic schools and branches

References

External links
 www.al-taqwa.vic.edu.au  al-Taqwa website

Islamic schools in Australia
Private schools in Victoria (Australia)
Islamic Schools of Victoria
Educational institutions established in 1986
1986 establishments in Australia